Maissana is a comune (municipality) in the Province of La Spezia in the Italian region Liguria, located about  east of Genoa and about  northwest of La Spezia.

Snowfalls are frequent and heavy. In February 2009, in just one night  of fresh snow has fallen.

Maissana borders the following municipalities: Carro, Casarza Ligure, Castiglione Chiavarese, Ne, Varese Ligure.

References

External links 
 

Cities and towns in Liguria